The following events related to sociology occurred in the 1900s (decade).

1900
Sigmund Freud's The Interpretation of Dreams is published.
Georg Simmel's The Philosophy of Money is published.

1901
Benjamin Seebohm Rowntree's Poverty, A Study of Town Life is published.

Births
February 13: Paul Lazarsfeld
April 13: Jacques Lacan
June 16: Henri Lefebvre
December 16: Margaret Mead

1902
Charles Horton Cooley's Human Nature and the Social Order is published.
Vladimir Ilyich Ulyanov Lenin's What is to be Done? is published.
Werner Sombart's Der moderne Kapitalismus is published
Lester Frank Ward's Dynamic Sociology is published.
Beatrice Webb's and Sidney Webb's Problems of Modern Industry is published.

1903
Victor Branford's On the origin and use of the word Sociology and on the relation of sociological to other studies and to practical problems is published.
Charles Booth's Life and Labour of the People of London is published.
W. E. B. Du Bois' The Souls of Black Folk is published.
Émile Durkheim's and Marcel Mauss' Primitive Classification is published.
Charlotte Perkins Gilman's The Home: Its Work and Influences is published.
Georg Simmel's The Metropolis and Mental Life is published.
Lester Frank Ward's Pure Sociology is published.

1904
Leonard Trelawny Hobhouse's Democracy and Reaction is published.
Thorstein Bunde Veblen's The Theory of Business Enterprise is published.
British Sociological Society is founded, James Bryce is elected first president.

1905
Jane Addams's An International Patriotism is published.
Georg Simmel's Philosophy of Fashion is published.
Max Weber's The Protestant Ethic and the Spirit of Capitalism is published.
The American Sociological Society is founded; this is later renamed the American Sociological Association.
The School of Sociology set up by the Charity Organisation Society for the training of Social Workers.

1906
Werner Sombart's Why is there no Socialism in the United States? is published.
William Graham Sumner's Folkways is published.
Lester Frank Ward's Applied Sociology is published.

1907
Henri Bergson's Creative Evolution is published.
Albion Small's General Sociology is published.
Albion Small's Adam Smith and Modern Sociology is published.
H.G. Wells' The So-Called Science of Society is published.
Chair of Sociology at the London School of Economics founded, the first in the United Kingdom, and is taken by Leonard Trelawny Hobhouse.

1908
Friedrich Nietzsche's Ecce Homo is published.
Georg Simmel's Sociology: Investigations on the Forms of Sociation (including "The Dyad" and "The Stranger") is published.
Georges Sorel's Reflections on Violence is published.
Georges Sorel's The Illusions of Progress is published.

1909
Charles Cooley's Social Organization is published.
Mary Coolidge's Chinese Immigrants is published.
Charles Arnold van Gennep's Rites of Passage is published.
Maurice Halbwach's Thèse de Droit is published.
Leonard Trelawny Hobhouse's The Origin and Development of Moral Ideas is published.
Karl Kautsky's Road to Power is published.
W. I. Thomas' Source Book of Social Origins is published.
The German Society for Sociology Is Founded by Max Weber, Georg Simmel and Ferdinand Tönnies among others, Tonnies serves as first president.

Deaths
August 19: Ludwig Gumplowicz

Sociology
Sociology timelines
1900s decade overviews